Caramiphen is an anticholinergic drug used in the treatment of Parkinson's disease.  In combination with phenylpropanolamine it is used as a cough suppressant and nasal decongestant to treat symptoms associated with respiratory illnesses such as cold, allergies, hay fever, and sinusitis. It was added to the British National Formulary in 1963, with a dosage of 10 to 20 mg. Side effects include nausea, dizziness, and drowsiness.

It binds to the sigma-1 receptor with an IC50 value of 25 nM.

Synthesis

The halogenation of 1-Phenylcyclopentanecarboxylic Acid [77-55-4] (1) gives 1-phenylcyclopentanecarbonyl chloride [17380-62-0] (2). Ester formation with diethylaminoethanol [100-37-8] (3) completes the synthesis of Caramiphen (4).

References

Muscarinic antagonists
Antitussives
Decongestants
Potassium channel blockers
Sigma receptor ligands
Diethylamino compounds